Joan Cardona Méndez (born 27 May 1998) is a male Spanish competitive sailor. He is a member of Real Club Náutico de Palma. He won the bronze medal in the Finn event at the 2020 Summer Olympics.

References

External links
 
 
 

Living people
1998 births
Spanish male sailors (sport)
Sportspeople from Menorca
Real Club Nautico de Palma sailors
World champions in sailing for Spain
Olympic sailors of Spain
Olympic medalists in sailing
Olympic bronze medalists for Spain
Sailors at the 2020 Summer Olympics – Finn
Medalists at the 2020 Summer Olympics